Pablo Rosenberg (born April 6, 1965) is an Argentine-Israeli singer and musician.

Pablo Rosenberg was born in Argentina in 1965. His family made aliyah to Israel when he was 6 years old. He joined the Israeli hard rock band “Stella Maris.”  In 2010, he joined the judging panel of Kochav Nolad, the Israeli version of American Idol.

Discography
 Our World
 The Best of the Best 
 The Best of Shlomi Shabat and Pablo Rosenberg
 Live in Caesarea
 The Collection
 Every Day More
 Twilight
 Only the Heart Knows

See also
Music of Israel
List of Argentine Jews
Israeli rock

References

1965 births
Living people
Israeli Jews
Israeli entertainers
Israeli rock singers
Jewish Argentine musicians
Singers from Rosario, Santa Fe
Argentine emigrants to Israel
People from Beit She'an